The Protest Festival of Kristiansand, Norway, is a protest against powerlessness and indifference, in support of commitment and action. A protest against standardisation of society and one-track market thinking and a feeble notion of tolerance.

A program in the spirit of Axel Jensen, Jens Bjørneboe and Henrik Wergeland.

The festival is supported by the Norwegian state cultural department with an annual Nkr 250.000 grant.

External links
Kristiansand Protestfestival – English official homepage
Norwegian Government Department for Children and Equality, announcement by Secretary Krishna Chudasama  	
Axel Jensen – Norwegian official homepage

Cultural festivals in Norway
Kristiansand
Counterculture festivals